The 1976 Austrian Grand Prix was a Formula One motor race held at the Österreichring on 15 August 1976. It was the eleventh race of the 1976 World Championship of F1 Drivers and the 1976 International Cup for F1 Constructors. 

The 54-lap race was won by John Watson, driving a Penske-Ford. As well as being Watson's first F1 victory, it was also the only F1 victory for the Penske team, coming a year after the death of their former driver Mark Donohue at the same circuit. Roger Penske would withdraw from F1 at the end of the season to concentrate on Indycars.

Jacques Laffite finished second in a Ligier-Matra, with Gunnar Nilsson third in a Lotus-Ford. Drivers' Championship challenger James Hunt finished fourth in his McLaren-Ford, having started from pole position.

Local drivers Otto Stuppacher and Karl Oppitzhauser had applied to enter the event, but were refused due to their lack of experience. They had entered under the ÖASC Racing Team banner, with Stuppacher bringing a Tyrrell 007 to the circuit, and Oppitzhauser a March 761. They petitioned the other teams for support, but none was forthcoming and hence they did not participate.

With local hero Niki Lauda still in hospital following his near-fatal accident at the Nürburgring two weeks previously, and Ferrari not entering the race in protest at the reinstatement of Hunt as the winner of the Spanish Grand Prix, there was talk that the race would be cancelled. In the event, the race went ahead, but was attended by fewer spectators than usual. 

, this remains the last World Championship race that Ferrari did not enter and the last time an American-licensed constructor won a F1 race. This would also be the last occasion to date that a female driver would not only qualify for but also finish a Grand Prix with Lella Lombardi qualifying 24th and finishing four laps down in 12th place in a RAM Racing entered Brabham.

Qualifying

Qualifying classification

Race

Classification

Championship standings after the race

Drivers' Championship standings

Constructors' Championship standings

References

Austrian Grand Prix
Grand Prix
Austrian Grand Prix